Gunnar Andersen (February 26, 1909 – 1988) was a Norwegian ski jumper. He won a gold medal in the individual large hill at the 1930 FIS Nordic World Ski Championships in Oslo.

External links

1909 births
1988 deaths
Norwegian male ski jumpers
FIS Nordic World Ski Championships medalists in ski jumping
20th-century Norwegian people